New York City's 42nd City Council district is one of 51 districts in the New York City Council. It has been represented by Democrat Charles Barron since 2022, succeeding his wife Inez Barron, who could not run again due to term limits. The Barrons have avoided term limits by trading control of the Council seat and the overlapping 60th district of the State Assembly since 2002.

Geography
District 42 is based in the easternmost neighborhoods of Brooklyn, covering most of East New York (including its New Lots, Spring Creek, and Starrett City subsections) and part of East Flatbush. Shirley Chisholm State Park is also located within the district, as are many of Jamaica Bay Wildlife Refuge's western islands.

The district overlaps with Brooklyn Community Boards 5, 16, 17, and 18, and with New York's 8th and 9th congressional districts. It also overlaps with the 18th, 19th, 20th, and 21st districts of the New York State Senate, and with the 54th, 55th, 58th, and 60th districts of the New York State Assembly.

Recent election results

2021
In 2019, voters in New York City approved Ballot Question 1, which implemented ranked-choice voting in all local elections. Under the new system, voters have the option to rank up to five candidates for every local office. Voters whose first-choice candidates fare poorly will have their votes redistributed to other candidates in their ranking until one candidate surpasses the 50 percent threshold. If one candidate surpasses 50 percent in first-choice votes, then ranked-choice tabulations will not occur.

2017

2013

References

New York City Council districts